Matvei Petrovich Bronstein (Vinnytsia – February 18, 1938) was a Soviet theoretical physicist, a pioneer of quantum gravity, author of works in astrophysics, semiconductors, quantum electrodynamics and cosmology, as well as of a number of books in popular science for children.

Career and personal life
Bronstein introduced the cGh scheme for classifying physical theories, with the aim of unifying special relativity (denoted by its constant c (the speed of light), gravitation (denoted by the gravitational constant G), and quantum mechanics (denoted by the Planck constant h).

He was married to Lydia Chukovskaya, a writer, human rights activist, and a friend of Andrei Sakharov.

In August 1937, while was living in his apartment at 38 Rubinstein Street, St. Petersburg, Bronstein was arrested as part of  the Great Purge. He was convicted by a list trial in February 1938 and executed the same day in a Leningrad prison. His wife was told that he had been sentenced to 10 years of labor camps without the right of correspondence.

Bronstein's books for children "Solar Matter", "X Rays", "Inventors of Radio" were republished after his reputation had been rehabilitated posthumously on 9 May 1957. In 1990, his wife had a monument erected in the Levashovo Memorial Cemetery where he was thought to have been buried.

The Bronstein Prize in Loop Quantum Gravity is offered to post-doctoral scholars in the field, the inaugural winner of which was Eugenio Bianchi in 2013.

Solar Matter
Samuil Marshak, a children's writer and editor, scouted Bronstein to write a popular science book for teenagers. Bronstein chose to describe spectral analysis, but it took many attempts as well as Marshak's advice to determine the best plot in which the story could relate a history of helium.

Solar Matter (Солнечное вещество) was first published in the Koster magazine in 1934 and then in book form in April 1936,. whereupon Bronstein made an inscription on a copy to L. Chukovskaya, his copy editor, “To my dear Lida, without whom I would have never been able to write this book.” Later, Chukovskaya wrote that the history of helium had become intertwined in her and Bronstein's life, “The work on the book brought us closer. In fact, the book got us married."

References

Further reading
Gorelik Gennady, Frenkel, Victor, Матвей Петрович Бронштейн, Moscow, Nauka, 1990
Gorelik Gennady, Frenkel, Victor, Matvei Petrovich Bronstein and Soviet Theoretical Physics in the Thirties, Birkhäuser Verlag, 1994 
Gorelik Gennady, 'Meine antisowjetische Taetigkeit...' Russische Physiker unter Stalin. Vieweg, 1995
Gorelik Gennady, Матвей Бронштейн и квантовая гравитация. К 70-летию нерешенной проблемы, Успехи физических наук  2005, No. 10 
 
"Solar Matter" (Solnechnoye veshestvo) chapter in the book “прочерк" (Procherk) by Lidya Chukovskaya, Vremya Время

External links
 Solar Matter, English translation (2020) by Maggie Kornell

1906 births
1938 deaths
People from Vinnytsia
People from Vinnitsky Uyezd
Ukrainian Jews
Soviet Jews
Soviet physicists
Russian children's writers
Great Purge victims from Ukraine
Jews executed by the Soviet Union
Soviet rehabilitations
Jewish Ukrainian scientists